Jerry O'Sullivan may refer to:

 Jerry O'Sullivan (GAA), Gaelic games administrator
 Jerry O'Sullivan (hurler) (1940–1985), Irish hurler and Gaelic footballer
 Jerry O'Sullivan (musician), Irish-American musician

See also
Gerry O'Sullivan (1936–1994), Irish politician
Gerry O'Sullivan (media) (born 1964), television executive
Gerald O'Sullivan (disambiguation)